The J. League Cup 2004, officially the 2004 J.League Yamazaki Nabisco Cup, was the 2nd edition of Japan soccer league cup tournament and the 12th edition under the current J. League Cup format. The championship started on March 27, and finished on November 3, 2004.

Teams from the J1 took part in the tournament. The tournament started from the group stage, where they're divided into four groups. The group winners and runners-up of each group qualifies for the quarter final.

Group stage

Group A

Group B

Group C

Group D

Knockout stage

Quarter finals

Semifinals

Final

Top goalscorers

Awards 
 MVP: Yoichi Doi (FC Tokyo)
 New Hero Prize: Makoto Hasebe (Urawa Red Diamonds)

References 
 J.League Official Site 

2004 domestic association football cups
2004
Lea